Throwim Way Leg is a 1998 book written by Australian scientist Tim Flannery. It documents Flannery's experiences conducting scientific research in the highlands of Papua New Guinea and Indonesian Western New Guinea. The book describes the flora and fauna of the island and the cultures of its various peoples. The title is an anglicised spelling of the New Guinean Pidgin "Tromoi Lek," to go on a journey.

Flannery recounts his 15 trips to New Guinea beginning in 1981, when he was aged 26. He identifies at least 17 previously undescribed species during this period.

See also

References

External links
 Throwim' Way Leg: Tree-Kangaroos, Possums, and Penis Gourds excerpt and text search
There Goes the Neighborhood NY Times review of Throwim Way Leg

Science books
Australian non-fiction books
Books by Tim Flannery
Western New Guinea
1998 non-fiction books
Books about Indonesia
Natural history of Papua New Guinea
Works about Papua New Guinea
Zoological literature
Books about indigenous peoples
Australian travel books
Works about Western New Guinea
Ecology books
Climate change books
Environmental non-fiction books